The 1940 Akron Zippers football team was an American football team that represented the University of Akron as an independent during the 1940 college football season. In its second and final season under head coach Thomas Dowler, the team compiled a 2–5–2 record and was outscored by a total of 106 to 90. Mike Fernella was the team captain.

Schedule

References

Akron
Akron Zips football seasons
Akron Zippers football